Essex Probate and Family Court is a Court Located on 36 Federal Street in Salem, Massachusetts in the County of Essex. The court deals in Probate and Family Law matters.

Justices
The Following Justices operate out of the Essex Probate & Family Court:

Honorable Jennifer Rivera-Ulwick, First Justice
Honorable Mary Anne Sahagian
Honorable Joan Armstrong
Honorable Randy Kaplan

Sources & Links
 Essex Probate & Family Court Official Website
 List of Probate Courts in Massachusetts

References

Government of Essex County, Massachusetts
Massachusetts state courts
Probate courts in the United States
Family courts
Courts and tribunals with year of establishment missing